Hippolyte is a genus of shrimp of the family Hippolytidae, containing the following species:

Hippolyte acuta (Stimpson, 1860)
Hippolyte australiensis (Stimpson, 1860)
Hippolyte bifidirostris (Miers, 1876)
Hippolyte californiensis Holmes, 1895
Hippolyte caradina Holthuis, 1947
Hippolyte catagrapha d'Udekem d'Acoz, 2007
Hippolyte clarki Chace, 1951
Hippolyte coerulescens (Fabricius, 1775)
Hippolyte edmondsoni Hayashi, 1981
Hippolyte garciarasoi d'Udekem d'Acoz, 1996
Hippolyte holthuisi Zariquiey-Alvarez, 1953
Hippolyte inermis Leach, 1815
Hippolyte jarvinensis Hayashi, 1981
Hippolyte kraussiana (Stimpson, 1860)
Hippolyte lagarderei d'Udekem d'Acoz, 1995
Hippolyte leptocerus (Heller, 1863)
Hippolyte leptometrae Ledoyer, 1969
Hippolyte longiallex d'Udekem d'Acoz, 2007
Hippolyte longirostris (Czerniavsky, 1868)
Hippolyte multicolorata Yaldwyn, 1971
Hippolyte nicholsoni Chace, 1972
Hippolyte niezabitowskii d'Udekem d'Acoz, 1996
Hippolyte obliquimanus Dana, 1852
Hippolyte palliola Kensley, 1970
Hippolyte pleuracantha (Stimpson, 1871)
Hippolyte prideauxiana Leach, 1817
Hippolyte proteus (Paul'son, 1875)
Hippolyte sapphica d'Udekem d'Acoz, 1993
Hippolyte varians Leach, 1814
Hippolyte ventricosa H. Milne-Edwards, 1837
Hippolyte williamsi Schmitt, 1924c
Hippolyte zostericola (Smith, 1873)

References

Hippolytidae
Decapod genera